August 10 - Eastern Orthodox liturgical calendar - August 12

All fixed commemorations below are observed on August 24 by Eastern Orthodox Churches on the Old Calendar.

For August 11, Orthodox Churches on the Old Calendar commemorate the Saints listed on July 29.

Feasts

 Afterfeast of the Transfiguration of Our Lord, God, and Savior Jesus Christ.

Saints

 Virgin-martyr Susanna and those with her (295):
 Hieromartyrs Gaius, Pope of Rome; the priest Gabinus; Martyrs Maximus, Claudius and his wife Praepedigna; and their sons Alexander and Cuthias.
 Holy Hieromartyr Archdeacon Euplus of Catania (304)
 Martyrs Neophytus, Zeno, Gaius, Mark, Macarius, and Gaianus, by fire.
 Martyr Ia and 9,000 with her in Persia (363)  (see also: August 4 and September 11)
 Venerable Passarion, Bishop in Palestine (428)  (see also: May 10)

Pre-Schism Western saints

 Saint Rufinus and Companions, an early bishop (Episcopus Marsorum), martyred with companions in Italy.
 Saint Tiburtius, a martyr in Rome, connected with the soldier-martyr St Sebastian and was entombed at the Via Lavicana (c. 288) 
 Saint Chromatius, the Prefect of Rome and father of St Tiburtius the martyr (3rd century)
 Saint Digna, a holy virgin in Todi in Umbria in Italy, lived as an anchoress in the mountains nearby during the persecution of Diocletian (4th century)
 Saint Taurinus, first Bishop of Evreux, Gaul (c. 412) 
 Saint Attracta (Athracht), an anchoress, first in Killaraght on Lough Gara and then in Drum near Boyle (5th century)
 Saint Equitius, founder of a number of monasteries in the province of Valeria in Italy (c. 540)
 Saint Bláán (Blane), Bishop of Bute, Scotland (c. 590) (see also: August 10)
 Saint Gaugericus (Gau, Géry), Bishop of Cambrai and Arras in France, Confessor (c. 625)
 Saint Lelia, a holy virgin connected with Limerick and Kerry; several places in Ireland are named after her.

Post-Schism Orthodox saints

 Monk-martyrs Basil and Theodore, of the Kiev Caves (1098)
 Saint Theodore (in monasticism Theodosius) of the Kiev Caves, Prince of Ostrog in Volhynia (1483) 
 Saint Niphon, Patriarch of Constantinople (1508)
 New Martyrs Anastasius Paneras of Asomaton, and Demetrius Begiazis of Agiasos on Lesbos, at Kasamba in Asia Minor (1816)
 Saint John, recluse of Svyatogorsk Monastery (1867)

New martyrs and confessors

 Venerable Martyr St Rafaela (Tertatska), (Rafaela of Chyhyryn), Igumenia (1926)

Other commemorations

 Commemoration of the Miracle (1716) of St. Spyridon (348) on Corfu with the Hagarenes.
 Repose of Elder Sampson (Sievers) (Edward von Sievers), Spiritual Director at Poltava's Monastery of the Exaltation of the Precious Cross (1979)
 Repose of Archpriest Nicholas Guryanov of Talabsk Island, in Pskov (Chudskoye) lake (2002)

Icon gallery

Notes

References

Sources
 August 11 / August 24. Orthodox Calendar (PRAVOSLAVIE.RU).
 August 24 / August 11. HOLY TRINITY RUSSIAN ORTHODOX CHURCH (A parish of the Patriarchate of Moscow).
 August 11. OCA - The Lives of the Saints.
 The Autonomous Orthodox Metropolia of Western Europe and the Americas (ROCOR). St. Hilarion Calendar of Saints for the year of our Lord 2004. St. Hilarion Press (Austin, TX). p. 59.
 Menologion: The Eleventh Day of the Month of August. Orthodoxy in China.
 August 11. Latin Saints of the Orthodox Patriarchate of Rome.
 The Roman Martyrology. Transl. by the Archbishop of Baltimore. Last Edition, According to the Copy Printed at Rome in 1914. Revised Edition, with the Imprimatur of His Eminence Cardinal Gibbons. Baltimore: John Murphy Company, 1916. pp. 239-240.
 Rev. Richard Stanton. A Menology of England and Wales, or, Brief Memorials of the Ancient British and English Saints Arranged According to the Calendar, Together with the Martyrs of the 16th and 17th Centuries. London: Burns & Oates, 1892. p. 389.

 Greek Sources
 Great Synaxaristes:  11 ΑΥΓΟΥΣΤΟΥ. ΜΕΓΑΣ ΣΥΝΑΞΑΡΙΣΤΗΣ.
  Συναξαριστής. 11 Αυγούστου. ECCLESIA.GR. (H ΕΚΚΛΗΣΙΑ ΤΗΣ ΕΛΛΑΔΟΣ).

 Russian Sources
  24 августа (11 августа). Православная Энциклопедия под редакцией Патриарха Московского и всея Руси Кирилла (электронная версия). (Orthodox Encyclopedia - Pravenc.ru).

August in the Eastern Orthodox calendar